Dharshani Dharmasiri (born 5 April 1986) is a Sri Lankan cricketer who played for the Sri Lanka women's cricket team. She made her Women's One Day International cricket (WODI) debut for Sri Lanka against England Women on 15 November 2010. She made her Women's Twenty20 International cricket (WT20I) debut for Sri Lanka against the West Indies Women on 1 May 2012. In May 2013, she was one of sixteen players to be named in a development squad by Sri Lanka Cricket.

References

External links
 

1986 births
Living people
Sri Lankan women cricketers
Sri Lanka women One Day International cricketers
Sri Lanka women Twenty20 International cricketers
Place of birth missing (living people)